Bon Tuman-e Yek (also Romanized as Bon Tūmān-e Yek and Bontūmān-e Yek) is a village in Mamulan Rural District, Mamulan District, Pol-e Dokhtar County, Lorestan Province, Iran. At the 2006 census, its population was 77, in 20 families.

References 

Towns and villages in Pol-e Dokhtar County